is the fourth Yu-Gi-Oh! anime television series by Nihon Ad Systems and TV Tokyo. It is directed by Satoshi Kuwahara and produced by Studio Gallop. The series aired in Japan on TV Tokyo between April 11, 2011 and September 24, 2012. A second series, Yu-Gi-Oh! Zexal II, began airing from October 7, 2012. The show also premiered on Toonzai in North America on October 15, 2011. It is the first Yu-Gi-Oh! series to be broadcast in high-definition in United States. The story follows the young duelist Yuma Tsukumo who partners up with an ethereal spirit named Astral, as they search for the 100 Number Duel Monsters cards, which will restore Astral's memories.

Six pieces of theme music are used for the series: three opening and three ending themes. For the 4Kids and Konami English dub versions, the opening theme is "Take a Chance" for all episodes.


Episode list

References

Zexal I (season 2)
2011 Japanese television seasons
2012 Japanese television seasons